JWH-057, also known as deoxy-Δ8-THC-DMH, is a selective cannabinoid ligand, with a binding affinity of Ki = 2.9 ± 1.6 nM for the CB2 subtype, and Ki = 23 ± 7 nM for CB1.

See also 
JWH-015
JWH-018
JWH-019
JWH-073

References 

JWH cannabinoids
Benzochromenes